The gospel of Luke and the Acts of the Apostles make up a two-volume work which scholars call Luke–Acts. The author is not named in either volume. According to a Church tradition, first attested by Irenaeus (c. 130 – c. 202 AD), he was the Luke named as a companion of Paul in three of the Pauline letters, but "a critical consensus emphasizes the countless contradictions between the account in Acts and the authentic Pauline letters." The eclipse of the traditional attribution to Luke the companion of Paul has meant that an early date for the gospel is now rarely put forward. Most scholars date the composition of the combined work to around 80–90 AD, although some others suggest 90–110, and there is textual evidence (the conflicts between Western and Alexandrian manuscript families) that Luke–Acts was still being substantially revised well into the 2nd century.

Common authorship of Luke and Acts

The Gospel of Luke and the Acts of the Apostles make up a two-part work, Luke–Acts, by the same anonymous author. It is usually dated to around 80–90 AD, although some scholars suggest 90–110. The first part, the Gospel of Luke, tells how God fulfilled his plan for the world's salvation through the life, death, and resurrection of Jesus of Nazareth, the promised messiah. Acts continues the story of Christianity in the 1st century, beginning with the ascension of Jesus to Heaven. The early chapters, set in Jerusalem, describe the Day of Pentecost (the coming of the Holy Spirit) and the growth of the church in Jerusalem. Initially, the Jews are receptive to the Christian message, but later they turn against the followers of Jesus. Rejected by the Jews, the message is taken to the Gentiles under the guidance of Paul the Apostle. The later chapters tell of Paul's conversion, his mission in Asia Minor and the Aegean, and finally his imprisonment in Rome, where, as the book ends, he awaits trial.

Both books are addressed to Theophilus, the author's patron—and perhaps a label for a Christian community as a whole as the name means "Beloved of God", and the preface of Acts explicitly references "my former book" about the life of Jesus—almost certainly the work we know as the Gospel of Luke.

Furthermore, there are linguistic and theological similarities between the Gospel of Luke and the Book of Acts. As one scholar writes, "the extensive linguistic and theological agreements and cross-references between the Gospel of Luke and the Acts indicate that both works derive from the same author".  Because of their common authorship, the Gospel of Luke and Acts of the Apostles are often jointly referred to simply as Luke-Acts.  Similarly, the author of Luke-Acts is often known as "Luke"—even among scholars who doubt that the author was actually named Luke.

Views on authorship

Traditional view - Luke the physician as author
The traditional view is that the Gospel of Luke and Acts were written by the physician Luke, a companion of Paul.   Many scholars believe him to be a Gentile Christian, though some scholars think Luke was a Hellenic Jew.  This Luke is mentioned in Paul's Epistle to Philemon (v.24), and in two other epistles which are traditionally ascribed to Paul (Colossians 4:14 and 2 Timothy 4:11).

The view that Luke-Acts was written by the physician Luke was virtually unanimous in the early Christian church. The Papyrus Bodmer XIV, which is the oldest known manuscript containing the ending of the gospel (dating to around 200 AD), uses the subscription "The Gospel According to Luke". Nearly all ancient sources also shared this theory of authorship—Irenaeus,  Tertullian,  Clement of Alexandria,  Origen, and the Muratorian Canon all regarded Luke as the author of the Luke-Acts. Neither Eusebius of Caesarea nor any other ancient writer mentions another tradition about authorship.

In addition to the authorship evidence provided by the ancient sources, some feel the text of Luke-Acts supports the conclusion that its author was a companion of Paul. First among such internal evidence are portions of the book which have come to be called the "we" passages (Acts 16:10–17; 20:5–15; 21:1–18; 27:1–37; 28:1-16). Although the bulk of Acts is written in the third person, several brief sections of the book are written from a first-person perspective. These "we" sections are written from the point of view of a traveling companion of Paul: e.g. "After Paul had seen the vision, we got ready at once to leave for Macedonia", "We put out to sea and sailed straight for Samothrace". Such passages would appear to have been written by someone who traveled with Paul during some portions of his ministry. Accordingly, some have used this evidence to support the conclusion that these passages, and therefore the entire text of the Luke-Acts, were written by a traveling companion of Paul's. The physician Luke would be one such person.

It has also been argued that the level of detail used in the narrative describing Paul's travels suggests an eyewitness source. In 1882 Hobart claimed that the vocabulary used in Luke-Acts suggests its author may have had medical training, but this assertion was challenged by an influential study by Cadbury in 1926 that argued Luke's medical terminology was no different than terminology used by other non physician authors such as Plutarch.

The traditional view recognizes that Luke was not an eyewitness of the events in the Gospel, nor of the events prior to Paul's arrival in Troas in Acts 16:8, and the first "we" passage is Acts 16:10. In the preface to Luke, the author refers to having eyewitness testimony of events in the Gospel "handed down to us" and to having undertaken a "careful investigation", but the author does not mention his own name or explicitly claim to be an eyewitness to any of the events, except for the we passages.

Critical view - Authentic letters of Paul do not refer to Luke as a physician
The Epistle to Philemon, almost universally accepted as an authentic letter of Paul, includes the name "Luke" among other "co-workers" of Paul who are sending greetings to the letter's recipients (Philemon, verse 24). The identification of Luke as a physician comes from Colossians 4:14, but Colossians is believed by most New Testament scholars to be pseudonymous. 2 Timothy 4:11 also mentions a "Luke" and refers to him being "with me" but most modern scholars do not accept 2 Timothy as an authentic letter of Paul.

Critical view - the "we" passages as fragments of earlier source

In the "we" passages, the narrative is written in the first person plural but the author never refers to himself as "I" or "me". Some regard the "we" passages as fragments of a second document, part of some earlier account, which was later incorporated into Acts by the later author of Luke-Acts. Many modern scholars have expressed doubt that the author of Luke-Acts was the physician Luke, and critical opinion on the subject was assessed to be roughly evenly divided near the end of the 20th century. Instead, they believe Luke-Acts was written by an anonymous Christian author who may not have been an eyewitness to any of the events recorded within the text. The author of Acts "wanted his readers to understand that he was for a time a traveling companion of Paul, even though he was not."
Alternatively Vernon Robbins (1978) regards the "we" passages as a Greek rhetorical device used for sea voyages. However, more recent scholars have since written on the incoherence of Robbins' sea voyages literary device theory by arguing that contemporary first-person accounts were the exception rather than the rule, that Robbins' cited literature is too broad in both linguistic range (Egyptian, Greek, and Latin) and its temporal extent (1800 BC to third century AD), many of the literary sea voyages cited represented the author's actual presence and were not literary devices at all, many of his examples use the third-person throughout and not just during sea voyages, etc.

Interpretation of the "we" passages in authorship discussions

The "we" passages—a number of verses in Acts are written in the first person plural ("we") apparently indicating that the writer is participating in the events he is describing—were first interpreted by Irenaeus as evidence that the writer was a personal eyewitness of these events, and a companion of Paul on his travels; the traditional Luke. This interpretation had come under sustained criticism by the middle of the twentieth century.

Although there currently exists no scholarly consensus on the "we" passages, three interpretations in particular have become dominant: a) the writer was a genuine historical eyewitness, b) the writer was redacting existing written material or oral sources, whether by genuine eyewitnesses or not, c) use of the first person plural is a deliberate stylistic device which was common to the genre of the work, but which was not intended to indicate a historical eyewitness. New Testament scholar Bart Ehrman goes beyond the theory of stylistic insertions to propose that the "we" passages are deliberate deceptions, designed to convince readers that the author was a travelling companion of Paul, even though he was not.

Historical eyewitness

The interpretation of the "we" passages as indicative that the writer was a historical eyewitness (whether Luke the evangelist or not), remains the most influential in current biblical studies. Objections to this viewpoint mainly take the form of the following two interpretations, but also include the claim that Luke-Acts contains differences in theology and historical narrative which are irreconcilable with the authentic letters of Paul the Apostle.

Redactor

The interpretation of the "we" passages as an earlier written source incorporated into Acts by a later redactor (whether Luke the evangelist or not), acknowledges the apparent historicity of these texts whilst viewing them as distinct from the main work. This view has been criticized for failing to provide sufficient evidence of a distinction between the source text and the document into which it was incorporated.

Stylistic convention

Noting the use of the "we" passages in the context of travel by ship, some scholars have viewed the "we" passages as a literary convention typical to shipboard voyages in travel romance literature of this period. This view has been criticized for failing to find appropriate parallels, and for failing to establish the existence of such a stylistic convention. Distinctive differences between Acts and the works of a fictional genre have also been noted, indicating that Acts does not belong to this genre.

Forgery
According to Bart D. Ehrman, the "we" passages are written by someone falsely claiming to have been a travelling companion of Paul, in order to present the untrue idea that the author had firsthand knowledge of Paul's views and activities.  Ehrman holds that The Acts of the Apostles is thereby shown to be a forgery.

Language 
Scholars have characterised the language used by the author of Luke–Acts as 'a more polished Greek than Mark', saying it 'at times lacks Mark's Hebraisms (cf. Mk 11:9; 14:36) or uses Greek equivalents (Lk 3:12; 6:15; 23:33).' However, some typical Hebraic phrases such as 'and it came to pass' can still be commonly found in Luke–Acts, and especially the L source verses appear to be based on Semitic sources; E. Earle Ellis (1999) cited as examples Luke 1:5–2:40; 5:1–11; 7:11–17, 36–50; 8:1–3; 9:51–56; 11:27f.; 13:10–17; 14:1–6; 17:11–19; 19:1–10; 23:50–24:53.

Some early scholars thought that the prevalence of Semitic idioms was much higher in the gospel and the first half of Acts than in the second half of Acts. They noted that the Acts narratives of the first half mostly took place inside the Levant while the narratives in the second half of Acts were mostly set in gentile environments outside the Levant. They also suggested that there was a link between the narratives' geography and the rate of Semitic idioms. This led Charles Cutler Torrey (1906) to hypothesise that Acts chapters 1–15 were translated from an Aramaic document. However, most of Torrey's arguments were rejected by other scholars, who pointed out that many Semitisms existed in Acts 16–28 as well.

See also 

 The Lost Chapter of the Acts of the Apostles
 Historical reliability of the Acts of the Apostles
 Authorship of the Pauline epistles

Notes

References

Citations

Bibliography

Sources 

 
 

 
 
 
 
 
 
 
 
 
 
 
 
 
 
 
 
 
 

 
 
 
 
 

 
 
 
 
 
 
 

 
 
 
 
 
 
 

 
 
 
 
 
 
 

Luke
Acts of the Apostles
Gospel of Luke